Blue Skies is the fourth studio album by the band Dehd. The album was released on May 27, 2022 by Fat Possum.

Background and recording
Dehd announced the new album in February 2022. The first single, "Bad Love" was released when the album was announced. In an interview with Nylon, band members Emily Kempf and Jason Balla respectively expressed agreement and disagreement that the album was similar to their previous album, Flower of Devotion.

Critical reception

In a review published by Pitchfork, Jayson Greene praised Dehd for remaining stylistically consistent with their previous album, Flower of Devotion. Greene wrote that "it can take a peculiar kind of nerve to stay the course". In a review for The Guardian, Ben Beaumont-Thomas referred to each song as individually "catchy and evocative" and the album as a whole as "casually masterly".

Track listing

References

2022 albums
Fat Possum Records albums
Dehd albums